The Battle of Dobrosin was a conflict between police of the Federal Republic of Yugoslavia and Albanian militant group Liberation Army of Preševo, Medveđa and Bujanovac (UÇPMB) during the 2000-2001 insurgency in the Preševo Valley. On 4 March, the UÇPMB numbering 500 insurgents attacked and captured the strategic village of Dobrosin. The capture of Dobrosin marked the beginning of the Insurgency in the Preševo Valley.

During the Battle 1 UÇPMB insurgent and 1 Serb policeman were killed, while 2 Serb policemen were wounded.

During the fighting, 175 civilians were displaced from the village and fled to neighbouring Kosovo.

Background 
The UÇPMB was created on January 26, 2000. On that day, Serbian police officers invaded the predominantly Albanian village of Dobrosin on the border with Kosovo. The village was part of the "demilitarized zone" following the Kosovo War and Kumanovo Agreement in 1999. After a firefight between the Serbian police and Albanian residents, two Albanian brothers were killed. Since then, uniformed LAPMB started to appear in the village.

References 

Albanian nationalism in Serbia
Dobrosin
Preševo Valley
Serbia and Montenegro
Yugoslav Wars
2001 in Yugoslavia
Dobrosin
Dobrosin
Dobrosin
May 2001 events in Europe